Supalai Park Towers are 3 residential high-rise buildings located on Soi Phahonyothin 21, Chatuchak district, Bangkok, Thailand. The three towers have 33 floors and were all completed in 2003. Opposite Supalai Park Towers is the Elephant Building, and next to the towers lies Index Living Mall.

Transportation 
 BTS Skytrain - Phahonyothin 24 Station
 MRT (Bangkok) - Phahon Yothin Station

External links
 Emporis

Skyscrapers in Bangkok
Chatuchak district
Residential skyscrapers in Thailand